Eudocima aurantia, the fruit-sucking moth, is a moth of the family Erebidae. The species was first described by Frederic Moore in 1877. It is found across south-east Asia, from Sri-Lanka to northern Queensland, Australia. It is also present on the Andamans.

Description
The wingspan is about 90–120 mm. Palpi with third joint long and spatulate at extremity. Forewings with produced apex to a rounded lobe. Head and thorax ferrous colored, with plum-color suffusion. Abdomen orange. Forewing ferrous with dark stria and slight purple bloom. The veins speckled with blue. Reniform green and indistinct. There is a dark line runs from apex to center of inner margin, sometimes with green patches beyond it. Hindwings orange with a large black lunule beyond lower angle of cell. A submarginal patch can be seen between veins 1 and 2. Ventral side orange. Forewings with black mark below angle of cell and beyond the cell between veins 3 and 5. Hindwings with lunule and patch of upperside.

Ecology
Larva has pinkish grey dorsal surface suffused darker to a V-shaped yellow band. It has black spiracles and marbled white-ringed rufous-orange ocellate marks with three ferrous lines crossing them. The larvae feed on Cocculus species. The adults are a pest on various fruits. They pierce the fruit in order to suck the juice.

Adults and caterpillars both harm fruits, by piercing, sucking juice and eating flesh. Fruits may show pre-mature fall due to the attack. Parasitoids such as Telenomus lucullus and Euplectrus melanocephalus used as controlling measures.

References

External links
Species info

Eudocima
Moths described in 1877